Desertobia is a genus of moths in the family Geometridae.

Species
 Desertobia nocturna Viidalepp, 1989

References
 Desertobia at Markku Savela's Lepidoptera and Some Other Life Forms
 Natural History Museum Lepidoptera genus database

Ennominae